Don't Blame Me may refer to:

 Don't Blame Me (TV series), an Australian children's program
 Don't Blame Me (manga)
 Don't Blame Me (album) by Marc Ribot
 "Don't Blame Me" (Dorothy Fields and Jimmy McHugh song), first published in 1933
 "Don't Blame Me" (Taylor Swift song), from the album Reputation (2017)
 "Don't Blame Me", a song by Little River Band from Playing to Win
 "Don't Blame Me", a B-side track by Ozzy Osbourne's on the single "Mama, I'm Coming Home"
 "Don't Blame Me", a song by Santigold from I Don't Want: The Gold Fire Sessions